The Secret of My Success could refer to:
The Secret of My Success (1965 film)
The Secret of My Success (1987 film)
Interesting Times: The Secret of My Success, a 2002 documentary film
"The Secret of My Success" (song), by Night Ranger on the album Big Life and in the soundtrack of the 1987 film 
The Secret of My Success (musical), a musical comedy play based on the 1987 movie